The 2019 SAFF Women's Championship was the 5th edition of the SAFF Women's Championship, the biennial international women's football championship contested by the national teams of the South Asian Football Federation (SAFF). Initially, scheduled from 17 to 26 December 2018 in Sri Lanka, the competition was rescheduled, as Sri Lanka withdrew as hosts. Afterwards, it was scheduled to be held in 2019 from 12–22 March and to be hosted by Nepal.

India is the current champions having defeated Nepal by 3–1 goals on 22 March 2019 in the final.

Participating teams
Defending champions India and Bangladesh were pitted in Group B and Group A respectively. In Group A, Nepal who finished second in the first three editions of the tournament were drawn with 2016 runners-up Bangladesh, Bhutan and Pakistan and in Group B, along with India, Maldives and Sri Lanka are placed. Afghanistan did not participate in this edition, though they played in the 2016 edition despite changing their sub-confederation from SAFF to CAFF in 2014. Later, Pakistan withdrew from the tournament.

Venue
The Sahid Rangsala in Biratnagar, Province No. 1, Nepal serves as the host venue for the SAFF Women's Championship.

Group stage
The group stage draw for the tournament was held on 13 November 2018 at the South Asian Football Federation head office in Dhaka.

All matches were played at Sahid Rangsala, Biratnagar, Nepal.
Times listed are UTC+05:45.

Group A

Group B

Knockout stage
Times listed are UTC+05:45.

Semi-finals

Final

Goalscorers

References

External links

 
2019
2019
2019 in Asian football
2018–19 in Indian football
2018–19 in Nepalese football
2019 in Bangladeshi football
2018–19 in Sri Lankan football
March 2019 sports events in Asia
2019 in women's association football
2019 in Nepalese sport